Two-time defending champions Martina Navratilova and Pam Shriver defeated Claudia Kohde-Kilsch and Helena Suková in the final, 6–3, 6–4 to win the women's doubles tennis title at the 1984 Australian Open. With the win, they became the third and fourth women in history (following Maria Bueno and Margaret Court) to complete a Grand Slam in women's doubles.

Seeds
Champion seeds are indicated in bold text while text in italics indicates the round in which those seeds were eliminated.

Draw

Final

Top half

Bottom half

External links
 1984 Australian Open – Women's draws and results at the International Tennis Federation

Women's Doubles
Australian Open (tennis) by year – Women's doubles